Free Beer, originally known as Vores Øl (English: Our Beer), is a Danish brand of beer that markets itself as being the world's first open-source beer. The beer was created in 2004 by students at the IT University of Copenhagen and the artist collective Superflex, to illustrate how concepts of the FOSS movement might be applied outside of the digital world. In contrast to the practice of trade secrets, the Free Beer brand advocates for the free sharing of recipes and formulas, analogizing it to the FOSS movement's open sharing of software and source code. Free Beer operates by sharing its recipe and trademark elements under the Creative Commons CC BY-SA license, with breweries and individuals.

History

Vores Øl 
In December 2004, a group of IT University of Copenhagen students and Superflex brewed a 100-litre batch of dark heavy beer in their school's cafeteria. The group labelled the beer Vores øl (Danish for Our Beer) after a 1994 Carlsberg beer advertisement slogan. A website was created to promote the project, and the beer's recipe and label designs were published under an open-source Creative Commons license, specifically the CC-BY-SA 2.5 license. Unlike software, cooking recipes aren't copyrightable, so the share-alike/copyleft licensing approach is legally questionable and untested in court. After its publication, the project received an overall positive reception from the international press and media for the political message.

Concept extension Free Beer 
The developers of the beer stated that the beer was primarily a medium for the message of "dogmatic notions of copyright and intellectual property that are dominating our culture", and admitted that the group had only limited experience in beer production and was not made up of beer gurus.
The addition of the non-traditional beer ingredient Guaraná was also partly inspired politically by a previously 2003 initiated Superflex project, "Guaraná Power", which focused on the support of Brazilian guaraná farmers with Fair trade.

After the first "Vores Øl" brewing of the open-source beer concept, Superflex continued to develop the concept under the name Free Beer. A new colorful, unusual Free Beer artwork should create associations with the "60's [artistic] liberation" and underline the freedom aspect of the concept. The later name Free Beer is a play on Richard Stallman's common remark that free software is "free as in speech, not free as in beer", who also suggested the creation of "Free software beer" instead of an "open source beer".

Recipe development 
While the first "Vores øl" recipe drew some technical criticism, the recipe was continuously updated and identified shortcomings were fixed. Originally, the homebrewing community complained about the quality of the process and ingredient description. Remarks were that it was not stated how much water to use in the mash, what type of yeast was to be used, the style of beer being produced (other than being dark and heavy), whether or not any hops were being added for aroma, fermentation temperature, or how the beer was supposed to taste. Making reference to the technical problems of when software instructions ("source code") cannot be made into a functioning program, it was mentioned that if this recipe were source code, it would not compile. Because of the underlying theme of the group's message, the correction and development of this recipe is actively encouraged (in software terminology "bug fixing and patches").

Due to the availability of the recipe and the many Free Beer brewings of breweries and individuals worldwide over the course of years, the recipe was updated several times. Later major Free Beer recipe iterations (v3.0 and 4.0) were also developed in collaboration with a local Danish and experienced brewery, Skands in Brøndby. As previous recipe shortcomings were corrected, for instance the amount of sugar was decreased by 90%, the quality of the beer improved significantly. The recipe's version, which has now reached 6.0 in 2017, illustrates the community's continuous collaborative improvement progress, made possible by the "open source" nature of Free Beer.

Derived beers 
Under its free license, this free beer encourages others to tweak the recipe and redistribute it. Commercial or amateur brewers are able to reuse the recipe. Known derivatives include:
 Switzerland/Lausanne: Le Baiser de la Princesse (French for: "The Kiss of the Princess"), in 2008.
 France/Schiltigheim: Affichage Libre, brewed specially for the 2011 edition of the Rencontres Mondiales du Logiciel Libre (free software meeting) in Strasbourg.

Others took the political idea of an "open/free beer" (not Free Beer recipe and label), opened their own beer recipes and/or artwork, often under free licenses:
 United States/Frederick: Flying Dog Brewery created in July 2007 an open source beer called "Collaborator Doppelbock" (while without specified license).
 Switzerland/Zürich: In 2008, project 21's "FreeBeer" brewed by "Wädi-Brau-Huus" in Wädenswil with own recipe and label.
 Germany/Hannover: In March 2009 a free Red Beer was brewed for a local Wikipedia group meeting in context of CeBIT under the name "HannoverWikiRed" 
 Italy/Farigliano: In 2008 the Baladin craft-brewery released "open-source" beer and made the recipes public.
 United States/Rockville: "Our Nation's Attic - American Pale Ale", beer recipe and label under CC0, an American pale ale brewed by "Living Proof Brewery" in 2011.
 New Zealand/Wellington Yeastie Boys' Digital IPA was released in late 2011 and won in 2012 a Gold Award of the Brewers Guild of New Zealand. The Digital IPA's recipe has been made widely available under a CC-SA-BY 3.0 license to enable home brewers to brew their own versions.
 Germany/Berlin: In 2012 Metamate created a mate infused beer named "Mier" under the CC-BY-NC-SA license, which was served for instance on the "EHSM - the frontiers of open source and DIY" meeting on DESY in 2014. The commercial production for the German market failed mostly due to the Reinheitsgebot which forbids additions like Mate, while the Mier recipe was adapted successfully for the Czech market.

 United States/Washington, D.C.: In August 2012 a petition on "We the people" was successful and the Barack Obama administration released the recipe of a White House brewed Honey Ale to the public (public domain).
 Argentina/Paraná, Entre Ríos: During the Hackathon Litoral 2015, a group of brewers created a fork of the Yeastie Boys Digital IPA with malt and hop of Argentina, recipe and artwork were released under CC.
 Scotland/Ellon, Aberdeenshire: In February 2016 BrewDog "open-sourced” its beer recipes to the public, making them a form of Free Beer.

Reception and impact
Since its first presentation, Free Beer was often reported by international printed and online media, and also discussed in specialist books regarding copyright. Free Beer received an overall positive reception from international press for the political message, was presented on many exhibitions and conferences, and inspired many breweries in adopting the concept.

Free Beer project was also well received by the FOSS and open content movement, for instance by Richard Stallman, Cory Doctorow, and Lawrence Lessig. It was presented and sold on several technology conferences and meetings, for instance the "Isummit 2008" and the RMLL 2011, 2012, and 2014. The FSCONS 2008 resulted also in a CC-BY-SA licensed Ebook with Free Beer artwork and title.
Free Beer was shown also in the context of several art exhibitions and museums, for instance the Art Basel Miami Beach 2006, the Van Abbemuseum, Netherlands 2007 or the Taipei Biennial 2010 (sponsored by TTL). Free Beer was also used in the context of anti-copyright activities and movements, illustrating the advantage of open knowledge for the society.

Gallery

See also 
 OpenCola (drink)
 Moonshine

References

External links 

 voresoel.dk original official page (archived)
 The official website: freebeer.org
 freebeer project of Superflex
 FreeBrewers beer recipes on github.com
 FreeBeer v1.2 book (2009, PDF)
 Recipe and label of the RMLL 2012 "Bière Libre"  (French)

Beer in Denmark
Free software
Open content projects
Food and drink introduced in 2004
Creative Commons-licensed works